The Soju Ga clan is one of the Korean clans. Their Bon-gwan is in Suzhou, Jiangsu, China, known as Soju in Korean. According to the research conducted by the Korean government in 1985, there were 7894 members of the Soju Ga clan. Their founder was  who was a soldier dispatched by Ming dynasty’s Wanli Emperor to combat opponents in Japanese invasions of Korea (1592–98).

See also 
 Korean clan names of foreign origin

References

External links 
 

 
Korean clan names of Chinese origin